Eslamabad-e Jadid is a village in Eslamabad Rural District of Eslamabad District of Parsabad County, Ardabil province, Iran. At the 2006 census, its population was 1,726 in 352 households, at which time it was in the former Qeshlaq-e Jonubi Rural District of the Central District. The following census in 2011 counted 1,501 people in 361 households. The latest census in 2016 showed a population of 1,585 people in 446 households, by which time Eslamabad District had been formed with two rural districts; it was the largest village in Eslamabad Rural District.

References 

Parsabad County

Towns and villages in Parsabad County

Populated places in Ardabil Province

Populated places in Parsabad County